Martin Richard Day (born November 10, 1988) is a Japanese-born American mixed martial artist who competes in the Bantamweight division. He formerly competed in the Ultimate Fighting Championship.

Background

The son of missionaries, Martin was born in Nagoya, Japan while his parents were stationed there and his family moved to Hawaii when he was 9 months old. He has eight other siblings.  He started training in Taekwondo when he was 13 and started competing around the same time. After starting boxing around the age of 15 and accumulated quite a bit of amateur kickboxing fights, he decided to try MMA. Currently, Day is a 4th degree Dan Black Belt in ITF Taekwondo.

Mixed martial arts career

Early career

Starting his career in 2015, Day earned an impressive record of 6–1, before he was invited on Dana White's Contender Series.  Day's lone loss in the road prior to DWTNCS came in March 2017 when he suffered defeat to Bellator MMA and LFA veteran Nohelin Hernandez.

Day's first shot under the ZUFFA lights came against Jaime Alvarez on Dana White's Contender Series 6 in August 2017. Day came out early with very solid leg kicks but was unable to get the judges’ decision at the end of the bout.

After the defeat, Day continued to win on the Hawaiian and California regional scenes. Day won all three of his following bouts, two of them by finishes. The final of the three was against the undefeated Brady Huang. Huang was 8-0 going into the matchup with all eight bouts ending by finish and seven of those eight ending in the first round. The two battled URCC 34: Destiny in August 2018 as the co-main event to former UFC veteran Tyson Griffin. Day made quick work of the undefeated star, knocking out Huang in the second round.

Ultimate Fighting Championship

Day made his UFC debut on November 24, 2018, at UFC Fight Night: Blaydes vs. Ngannou 2 against Liu Pingyuan. He lost the fight via split decision.

Martin Day faced Davey Grant on July 11, 2020, at UFC 251. He lost the fight via knockout in the third round.

Day fought Anderson dos Santos on November 28, 2020, at UFC on ESPN: Smith vs. Clark. He lost the fight via first round guillotine choke.

Day faced Timur Valiev on February 6, 2021, at UFC Fight Night: Overeem vs. Volkov. He lost the fight via unanimous decision.

On February 18, 2021, it was announced that Day had been released from the UFC.

Post UFC 
In his first appearance after leaving the UFC, Day faced Ramon Taveras on April 30, 2022 at Combat Night Pro:Jacksonville. He lost the bout via guillotine choke in the first round.

Championships and accomplishments
 Universal Reality Combat Championship 
URCC Bantamweight Championship (One time)

Mixed martial arts record

|-
|Loss
|align=center|8–7
|Ramon Taveras
|Submission (guillotine choke)
|Combat Night Pro: Jacksonville
|
|align=center|1
|align=center|2:40
|Jacksonville, Florida, United States
|
|-
|Loss
|align=center|8–6
|Timur Valiev
|Decision (unanimous)
|UFC Fight Night: Overeem vs. Volkov
|
|align=center|3
|align=center|5:00
|Las Vegas, Nevada, United States
|
|-
| Loss
| align=center| 8–5
| Anderson dos Santos
| Submission (guillotine choke)
| UFC on ESPN: Smith vs. Clark
| 
| align=center| 1
| align=center|4:35
| Las Vegas, Nevada, United States
| 
|-
| Loss
| align=center| 8–4
| Davey Grant
|KO (punch)
|UFC 251 
|
|align=center|3
|align=center|2:38
|Abu Dhabi, United Arab Emirates
|
|-
| Loss
| align=center|8–3
| Liu Pingyuan
|Decision (split)
|UFC Fight Night: Blaydes vs. Ngannou 2
|
|align=center| 3
|align=center| 5:00
|Beijing, China
|
|-
| Win
| align=center|8–2
| Brady Huang
| TKO
| URCC 34
| 
| align=center|2
| align=center|1:10
| Richmond, California, United States
|
|-
| Win
| align=center|7–2
| Shojin Miki
| Decision (unanimous)
| Destiny MMA: Fight Night 5
| 
| align=center|3
| align=center|5:00
| Honolulu, Hawaii, United States
|
|-
| Win
| align=center|6–2
| Richard Barnard
| Submission (guillotine choke)
| Destiny MMA: Fight Night 4
| 
| align=center|1
| align=center|0:55
| Honolulu, Hawaii, United States
|
|-
| Loss
| align=center| 5–2
| Jaime Alvarez
| Decision (split)
|Dana White's Contender Series 6
|
|align=center|3
|align=center|5:00
|Las Vegas, Nevada, United States
|
|-
| Win
| align=center| 5–1
| Shojin Miki
| KO (punches)
| Mid-Pacific Championships 3
|
|align=Center|1
|align=center|4:31
|Honolulu, Hawaii, United States
|
|-
| Loss
| align=center| 4–1
| Nohelin Hernandez
| TKO (punches)
| Global Knockout 9
| 
| align=center| 2
| align=center| N/A
| Jackson, California, United States
| 
|-
| Win
| align=center| 4–0
| Richard Parra III
| Decision (split)
| Tachi Palace Fights 28
| 
| align=center| 3
| align=center| 5:00
| Lemoore, California, United States
| 
|-
| Win
| align=center| 3–0
| Anthony Torres
| TKO (punches)
| WFC 17
| 
| align=center| 1
| align=center| 1:55
| Sacramento, California, United States
| 
|-
| Win
| align=center| 2–0
| Jeffery Oher
| TKO (punches)
| Destiny MMA: Trinity Sport Combat
| 
| align=center| 2
| align=center| 2:50
| Kapolei, Hawaii, United States
|
|-
| Win
| align=center| 1–0
| Dylan Morgan
| Decision (split)
| Destiny MMA: Na Koa 8
| 
| align=center| 3
| align=center| 5:00
| Honolulu, Hawaii, United States
|

See also 
 List of male mixed martial artists

References

External links 
  
 

1988 births
Living people
American male mixed martial artists
Japanese male mixed martial artists
Bantamweight mixed martial artists
Mixed martial artists utilizing taekwondo
Mixed martial artists utilizing boxing
Ultimate Fighting Championship male fighters
American male taekwondo practitioners
Japanese male taekwondo practitioners